"Good Time" (stylized in all caps) is a song co-written and recorded by American singer and songwriter Niko Moon. It was released on July 19, 2019, and serviced to country radio on March 16, 2020, as the lead single from his debut album of the same name (2021). Originally writing the song to pitch to other country artists, Moon ended up keeping it for himself when working on his album. In March 2021, "Good Time" became Moon's first number-one hit on both the Billboard Country Airplay and Hot Country Songs charts. It also reached number 20 on the Hot 100. The song was certified 2× Platinum by the Recording Industry Association of America (RIAA), denoting sales of over two million units in that country. In Canada, the track reached the top 10 of the Canada Country chart and number 74 on the Canadian Hot 100. An accompanying music video for the song, directed by Moon, features a campfire party in the woods.

Background
Moon co-wrote "Good Time" with his wife Anna Moon, Jordan Minton, Joshua Murty, and Mark Trussell. He originally wrote the song planning to pitch it to other country artists, but ultimately wound up keeping the song for himself when he began working on his album.

Music video
The music video premiered on September 16, 2019, which was filmed in Nashville, Tennessee, and features his friends from Georgia partying around a campfire in the woods. Moon self-directed the video.

Commercial performance
"Good Time" debuted at number 95 on the Billboard Hot 100 the week of October 10, 2020 before leaving the next week. Twenty-one weeks later, it peaked at number 20 the week of March 13, 2021, and stayed on the chart for twenty-five weeks. In Canada, the song debuted at number 81 on the Canadian Hot 100 the week of January 16, 2021 before leaving the next week. It peaked at number 74 the week of February 13, and remained on the chart for six weeks.

Charts

Weekly charts

Year-end charts

Certifications

Release history

References

2019 debut singles
2019 singles
2019 songs
Country rap songs
Niko Moon songs
RCA Records Nashville singles
Songs written by Niko Moon